Castilleja beldingii is a species of hemiparasitic plant in the broomrape family, formerly the only species in the genus Clevelandia, it was moved to the genus Castilleja, the 'indian paintbrushes', in 2009.

Taxonomy
Edward Lee Greene first described it as Orthocarpus beldingi in 1885, but he later reclassified it in the monotypic genus Clevelandia in the Bulletin of the California Academy of Sciences in 1886. The spelling was later correct to beldingii. However, Greene reclassified it invalidly, the German taxonomist Karl August Otto Hoffmann rectified this and published Greene's name correctly in Adolf Engler's classic Die natürlichen Pflanzenfamilien in 1893. After molecular phylogenetic work, Tank et al moved it to the large genus Castilleja in 2009.

The lectotype was collected in the Sierra La Victoria by the American ornithologist Lyman Belding during his expedition to Baja California in 1883. It was only designated as such in 2009 by Tank et al.

Etymology
Its former generic name Clevelandia honours the San Diego-based plant collector and lawyer Daniel Cleveland (1838–1929), for whom numerous other plants were named, as well as a second Clevelandia genus (the arrow goby, a fish):

Distribution
It is native to Baja California and Baja California Sur, in northwestern Mexico.

References

Orobanchaceae
Endemic flora of Mexico
Flora of Baja California
Flora of Baja California Sur
Plants described in 1891